Haad is a Bosnian fashion house launched by designer Adnan Hajrulahović. His fashion studio is based in Sarajevo, Bosnia and Herzegovina. In 2013 Adnan Hajrulahović started his Get a game sports line, signing a kit sponsorship agreement with Bosnian football club FK Sarajevo.

On 31 March 2015 the label signed a kit sponsorship agreement with the Basketball Federation of Bosnia and Herzegovina. In May 2015 Haad Get a game opened a new factory in Zenica for the purpose of expanding its production.
In the 2017-2018 Premier League BH season Haad has dropped an other important technical supplier deal with the football section of FK Velež Mostar, for 2 season duration.

References

Sportswear brands
Clothing brands of Bosnia and Herzegovina
1980 births
Living people